Cynthia Mira Sharma (born 1979) is a German biologist who is Chair of Molecular Infection Biology at the University of Würzburg. Her research considers how bacteria regulate gene mechanisms. She was awarded a European Research Council Consolidator Grant in 2022.

Early life and education 
Sharma attended the Steinbart-Gymnasium in Duisburg. She was an undergraduate at the Heinrich Heine University Düsseldorf and moved to the Max Planck Institute for Infection Biology for her graduate studies, during which she studied small regulatory RNAs. She remained at the Max Planck Institute for Infection Biology for a postdoctoral position with Jörg Vogel. In late 2010, she moved to the United States, where she worked alongside Gisela Storz at the National Institutes of Health.

Research and career 
In 2010, Sharma moved to the University of Würzburg Research Center for Infectious Diseases (ZINF, Zentrum für Infektionsforschung), where she was made a group leader. Her research considers bacterial pathogens and how they adapt to their hosts. She is particularly interested in how bacteria regulate gene mechanisms. She is interested in the proteins that bind RNA, which are important in cell physiology. She has also identified that there are several proteins that can interact with RNA despite not possessing canonical RNA binding domains.

During the COVID-19 pandemic, Sharma realised a COVID-19 test based on CRISPR. The test, Leveraging Engineered tracrRNAs and On-target DNAs for PArallel RNA Detection, (LEOPARD), can detect many RNAs at once, offering the potential to identify several disease-related biomarkers.

Sharma was awarded a European Research Council Consolidator Grant in 2022.

Awards and honours 
 2011 Ingrid zu Solms-Naturwissenschaftspreis 
 2011 Robert-Koch-Postdoktorandenpreis für Mikrobiologie
 2012 Junges Kolleg der Bayerischen Akademie der Wissenschaften
 2013 DGHM-Förderpreis
 2014 ESCMID Research Grant
 2015 German Research Foundation Heinz Maier-Leibnitz Preis
 2021 Falling Walls Winner
 2022 European Research Council Consolidator Grant

Selected publications

References 

1979 births
Living people
Heinrich Heine University Düsseldorf alumni
Max Planck Society people
Academic staff of the University of Würzburg
German biologists
20th-century German scientists
21st-century German scientists
German women scientists